KITM-LD, virtual and VHF digital channel 2, was a low-powered television station serving Maui County, Hawaii, United States that was licensed to serve Lahaina. The station was owned by Mark C. Allen. KITM-LD programmed classic shows and movies.

The station served a 3695.8 square mile area, and covered an estimated population of 153,689.

On October 1, 2017, an agreement was made to transfer ownership of the station to A&W Network, which is a partnership between the previous owner and a new partner.

KITM-LD's license was cancelled by the Federal Communications Commission on February 9, 2023, for failure to file an application for license renewal.

Digital channel

References

External links

ITM-LD
Television channels and stations established in 2014
Low-power television stations in the United States
2014 establishments in Hawaii
Defunct television stations in the United States
Television channels and stations disestablished in 2023
2023 disestablishments in Hawaii